The South American Under-23 Championships in Athletics (Campeonatos
Sudamericanos de Atletismo de Sub-23) is an under-23 athletics competition held between the member associations of the
South American Athletics Confederation
(ConSudAtle).  Rules and regulations are displayed on the ConSudAtle webpage.  In 2006 and 2010, the championships were held as part of the
athletics section of South American Games (ODESUR).

Editions

Medal table (2004–2018)

Records

Men

Women

Mixed

References

 
Continental athletics championships
Under-23 athletics competitions
Recurring sporting events established in 2004
U23
Athletics U23
Biennial athletics competitions
South American youth sports competitions